Cambaz is a village in the Karacabey district of Bursa Province in Turkey.

References 

Villages in Karacabey District